William Chorlton may refer to:

William Wade, Baron Wade of Chorlton (1932–2018)
William Charlton (died 1567) or William Chorlton, MP